Waterfall (Manx: Yn Eas) (sometimes referred to on timetables as "Waterfalls") was the only intermediate station on the Foxdale Railway on the Isle of Man.

Facilities

The halt consisted of a simple lineside shelter, with no passing loop or passenger facilities; the line was primarily involved in the transportation of iron ore from the mining village of Foxdale and most services were of mixed trains.  Indeed, the railway only ever had one coach, known as "The Foxdale Coach" which was No. 15 in the Manx Northern Railway's numbering scheme, and remains in service today as F.39 on the Isle of Man Railway from Douglas to Port Erin.

Route

See also
 Isle of Man Railway stations
 Foxdale

References

Sources
 James I.C. Boyd Isle Of Man Railway, Volume 3, The Routes & Rolling Stock (1996) 
 Norman Jones Scenes from the Past: Isle of Man Railway (1994) 
 Robert Hendry Rails in the Isle of Man: A Colour Celebration (1993) 
 A.M Goodwyn Manx Transport Kaleidoscope, 2nd Edition (1995)

Railway stations in the Isle of Man
Railway stations opened in 1886
Railway stations closed in 1940